Antotinha is a village in the Cacheu Region of northwestern Guinea-Bissau. It lies to the north of the Cacheu River, north and across the river from São Vicente.

References

Populated places in Guinea-Bissau
Cacheu Region